Erich Lindemann (May 8, 1888, in Güstrow, Mecklenburg-VorpommernMay 2, 1945, in Erbach, Hesse) was a German phycologist and taxonomist.

Early life, education, and family
Lindemann's father was a teacher with Protestant-Lutheran confession. Lindemann was unmarried. As Sergeant, he participated in World War I and was decorated with the Iron Cross.

Career
After secondary education, Erich Berthold Ludwig Wilhelm Lindemann studied natural science in Munich, Berlin and particularly Rostock. He practised as teacher ‒in this order‒ at the gymnasium Rawicz, at the Realschulen Chodzież, Poznań and Wolsztyn, at the gymnasiums Rogoźno and Ostrów Wielkopolski and at royal Comenius-gymnasium in Leszno. In Wrocław, Lindemann completed his PhD at the Schlesische Friedrich-Wilhelms-Universität zu Breslau in 1915. From 1919 to 1924, Lindemann was teacher in Tempelhof (Berlin), but was put in retirement in 1933 at the latest.

Lindemann's scientific work comprises the description of numerous dinophyte species. He was editor of the journal Schriften für Süßwasser- und Meereskunde und founding member of the International Society of Limnology

Works
 Studien zur Biologie der Teichgewässer, Breslau: Borntraeger, 1915
 Studien zur Biologie der Teichgewässer in Zeitschrift für Fischerei Berlin 17, 1915: 69–154
 PeridiniumGüstrowiense n. sp. und seine Variationsformen in Archiv für Hydrobiologie 11, 1916: 490–495
 Beiträge zur Kenntnis des Seenplanktons der Provinz Posen in Zeitschrift der Naturwissenschaftlichen Abteilung der Deutschen Gesellschaft für Kunst und Wissenschaft in Posen 23, 1916: 2–31
 Zur Biologie einiger Gewässer der Umgebung von Güstrow in Mecklenburg-Schwerin in Archiv des Vereins der Freunde der Naturgeschichte in Mecklenburg 71, 1917: 105–134
 Beiträge zur Kenntnis des Seenplanktons der Provinz Posen (Südwest-Posen, Seengrupe) II in Zeitschrift der Naturwissenschaftlichen Abteilung der Deutschen Gesellschaft für Kunst und Wissenschaft in Posen 24, 1917: 2–41.
 Mitteilungen über Posener Peridineen in Zeitschrift der Naturwissenschaftlichen Abteilung der Deutschen Gesellschaft für Kunst und Wissenschaft in Posen 25, 1918: 23–25.
 Untersuchungen über Süßwasserperidineen und ihre Variationsformen in Archiv für Protistenkunde 39, 1919: 209–262
 Untersuchungen über Süßwasserperidineen und ihre Variationsformen II in Archiv für Naturgeschichte 84, 1920: 121–194
 Technische Winke für die Untersuchungen von Süßwasserperidineen in Mikrobiologische Monatshefte 12, 1922: 1–13
 Ein neues Spirodinium in Hedwigia 64, 1923: 146–147
 Eine Entwicklungshemmung bei Peridiniumborgei und ihre Folgen in Archiv für Protistenkunde 46, 1923: 378–382
 Neue oder wenig bekannte Protisten. IX. Neue oder wenig bekannte Flagellaten. VIII. Neue von G. J. Playfair beschriebene Süßwasserperidineen aus Australien, mit kritischen Bemerkungen über ihre systematische Stellung in Archiv für Protistenkunde 47, 1924: 109–130
 Eine interessante Süsswasserflagellate in: 7–10
 Die Mikroflora des Zwergbirkenmoors von Neulinum in: 38–42 (co-author: Steinecke, F.)
 UeberPeridineen einiger Seen Süddeutschlands und des Alpengebietes in: 158–163
 Der Bau der Hülle bei Heterocapsa und Kryptoperidiniumfoliaceum (Stein) n. nom. in Botanisches Archiv 5, 1924: 114–120
 Eine tierische Pflanze — ein pflanzenhaftes Tier! in Schriften für Süßwasser- und Meereskunde 2, 1924: 274–277
 Neue oder wenig bekannte Protisten. X. Neue oder wenig bekannte Flagellaten. IX. Mitteilungen über nicht genügend bekannte Peridineen in Archiv für Protistenkunde 47, 1924: 431–439
 Peridineen aus dem Alpengebiete in Schriften für Süßwasser- und Meereskunde 2, 1924: 194–200
 Peridineen aus dem Goldenen Horn und Bosporus in Botanisches Archiv 5, 1924: 216–233
 Peridineen des Alpenrandgebietes in Botanisches Archiv 8, 1924: 297–303
 Vom Plankton des Golfes von Neapel in Schriften für Süßwasser- und Meereskunde 2, 1924: 3–11
 Vom Plankton warmer Meere in Die Naturwissenschaften 12, 1924: 888–895
 III. Klasse: Dinoflagellatae (Peridineae), pp. 144–195 in: Schoenichen, W., (ed), Einfachste Lebensformen des Tier- und Pflanzenreiches. Naturgeschichte der mikroskopischen Süßwasserbewohner, Berlin: Bermühler, 1925.
 Die Schwalbenschwanzalge (Ceratium hirundinella O. Fr. M.) in Mikrokosmos 18y 14–20
 Neubeobachtungen an den Winterperidineen des Golfes von Neapel in Botanisches Archiv 9, 1925: 95–102.
 Peridineen aus Seen der Schweiz in Botanisches Archiv 10, 1925: 205–208.
 Peridineen des Oberrheins und seiner Altwässer in Botanisches Archiv 11, 1925: 474–481
 Ueber finnische Peridineen in Archiv für Hydrobiologie 15, 1925: 1–4
 Der dritte Limnologenkongreß in Rußland. in Der Naturforscher 2, 1925, S. 429–430, pl. LIX.
 Fahrt durch das europäische Rußland. in Ostdeutscher Naturwart 2, 1925, S. 552–557.
 Bewegeliche Hüllenfelderung und ihr Einfluss auf die Frage der Artbildung bei Glenodinien in Archiv für Hydrobiologie 16, 1926: 437–458
 Peridineen aus Altwässern des Flusses Donjez bei Charkow (Ukraine) in Botanisches Archiv 14, 1926:467–473
 Massensterben von Fischen infolge einer Hochproduktion von Panzergeißlingen (Peridineen) in Kleine Mitteilungen für die Mitglieder des Vereins für Wasserversorgung und Abwässerbeseitigung 2, 1926: 113–119.
 Die 3. Tagung der Internationalen Vereinigung für theoretische und angewandte Limnologie in Rußland in Mikrokosmos 19, 1926: 60–62
 Peridineenbestimmungen in Mikrokosmos 19: 31–33, 1926
 Die Süßwasser-Diplopsalis im Kaspischen Meere in Mikrokosmos 20, 1927: 124–125
 Dinoflagellaten aus der Wolga in Arbeiten der Biologischen Wolga-Station 9, 1927: 1–3
 Über einige Dinoflagellaten des Kaspischen Meeres in Archiv für Protistenkunde 59, 1927: 418–422
 Über einige Peridineen des Kieshofer Moores in Beiträge zur Naturdenkmalpflege 12, 1927: 130–135
 Abteilung Peridineae (Dinoflagellatae), pp. 3–104 in: Engler, A., & Prantl, K., (eds), Die natürlichen Pflanzenfamilien, 2. ed., Leipzig: Engelmann, 1928
 Über die Schwimmbewegungen einer experimentell eingeißelig gemachten Dinoflagellate in Archiv für Protistenkunde 64, 1928: 507–510
 Neue Peridineen in Hedwigia 68, 1928: 291–296
 Parasitische Dinoflagellaten in Mikrokosmos 21, 1928: 122–126
 Vorläufige Mitteilung in Archiv für Protistenkunde 63, 1928: 259–260
 Experimentelle Studien über die Fortpflanzungserscheinungen der Süßwasserperidineen auf Grund von Reinkulturen inArchiv für Protistenkunde 68, 1929: 1–104
 Über eine limnologische Bedeutung der freien Kohlensäure in Die Naturwissenschaften 51, 1930: 1113
 Die Peridinineen der deutschen limnologischen Sunda-Expedition nach Sumatra, Java und Bali in Archiv für Hydrobiologie Suppl. 8, 1931: 691–732

 Eponymy: Hemidinium lindemannii Skvortsov, Peridinium lindemannii M.Lefèvre, Stylodinium lindemannii'' Baumeister.

References

German phycologists
1888 births
Scientists from Mecklenburg-Western Pomerania
1945 deaths
German Army personnel of World War I
Recipients of the Iron Cross (1914)